Arthur Ecclestone (1 March 1906 – 1990) was an English footballer who played at inside-left for Port Vale in the 1920s.

Career
Ecclestone played for Stone Lotus before joining Port Vale in November 1924. He made his debut in a 3–1 defeat to Wolverhampton Wanderers at Molineux on 17 April 1926, in one of the last games of the 1925–26 season. He played one Second Division game in the 1926–27 season, before he was given a free transfer away from The Old Recreation Ground in May 1928.

Career statistics
Source:

References

1906 births
1990 deaths
Sportspeople from Stafford
English footballers
Association football midfielders
Port Vale F.C. players
English Football League players